This is a list of notable people who have claimed to have the neurological condition synesthesia. Following that, there is a list of people who are often wrongly believed to have had synesthesia because they used it as a device in their art, poetry or music (referred to as pseudo-synesthetes).

Estimates of prevalence of synesthesia have ranged widely, from 1 in 4 to 1 in 25,000 – 100,000. However, most studies have relied on synesthetes reporting themselves, introducing self-referral bias.

Media outlets including Pitchfork have critically noted the considerable numbers of musical artists from the 2010s onwards claiming to be synesthetes, observing that "without literally testing every person who comes out in the press as a synesthete, it’s exceedingly difficult to tell who has it and who is lying through their teeth for cultural cachet" and that claims of experiencing synesthesia can be employed "as an express route to creative genius".

Synesthetes

Pseudo-synesthetes 
 Alexander Scriabin (6 January 1872 – 27 April 1915) probably was not a synesthete, but, rather, was highly influenced by the French and Russian salon fashions.  Most noticeably, Scriabin seems to have been strongly influenced by the writings and talks of the Russian mystic Helena P. Blavatsky, founder of the Theosophical Society and author of such works as Isis Unveiled and The Secret Doctrine.  The synesthetic motifs found in Scriabin's compositions – most noticeably in Prometheus, composed in 1911 – are developed from ideas from Isaac Newton, and follow a circle of fifths.
Arthur Rimbaud may or may not have been a synesthete. He wrote a poem about vowels all having colours, but he might not have actually perceived graphemes in colour.

References

Synesthesia
Synesthesia
Lists of people with disabilities